Charles Tillinghast Patterson (February 4, 1869 - March 27, 1918) was an owner and trainer of Thoroughbred racehorses best known for his win in the 1917 Kentucky Derby with Omar Khayyam and as the owner and trainer of Ornament, the 1897 American Horse of the Year and American Champion Three-Year-Old Male Horse.

Patterson's father was an owner of Standardbred horses and as  young man, Charles was a harness racing driver. In 1891 his interests shifted to Thoroughbred racing and he was hired to train the horses of renowned Kentucky owner and breeder John Madden.

Charles Patterson died on March 27, 1918. He was training for Robert L. Gerry from a base at Belmont Park at the time of his death.

References

	
1869 births
1918 deaths
American horse trainers
American racehorse owners and breeders
Sportspeople from Pittsburgh